Bruce Bergey (born August 8, 1946) is a former American football defensive end. He played for the Kansas City Chiefs and Houston Oilers in 1971 and for the Toronto Argonauts from 1972 to 1973.

References

1946 births
Living people
American football defensive ends
UCLA Bruins football players
Kansas City Chiefs players
Houston Oilers players
Toronto Argonauts players
Portland Storm players
Portland Thunder players
People from Cattaraugus County, New York
Players of American football from New York (state)